Julie Brigham-Grette is a glacial geologist and a professor in the Department of Geosciences at the University of Massachusetts Amherst where she co-directs the Joseph Hartshorn Quaternary Laboratory. Her research expertise is in glacial geology and paleoclimatology; she has made  important contributions to Arctic marine and terrestrial paleoclimate records of late Cenozoic to recent, the evolution of the Arctic climate, especially in the Beringia/Bering Strait region, and was a leader of the international Lake El’gygytgyn Drilling Project in northeastern Russia.

Early life and education 
Brigham-Grette received a BA in geology from Albion College (Michigan) in 1976 graduating magna cum laude. While an undergraduate enrolled in a course on Glaciers and the Pleistocene at Albion College, Professor Lawrence D. Taylor inspired her to study glacial geology and paleoclimatology.

In 1977, Brigham-Grette began her graduate studies at the Institute of Arctic and Alpine Research (INSTAAR) at the University of Colorado Boulder. There she worked with Professor John T. Andrews (geologist) investigating the glacial and sea-level record of a region of the Cumberland Peninsula on Baffin Island (eastern Canadian Arctic). Brigham-Grette received her M.Sc. in Geology in August 1980 with the thesis entitled “Stratigraphy, Amino Acid Geochronology, and Genesis of Quaternary Sediments, Broughton Island, S.E. Baffin Island, Canada.” Her master's research led to her dissertation project where she continued to focus on Arctic climate change and investigated the Pliocene-Pleistocene sea level history of the Alaskan Arctic Coastal Plain working under the direction of Professor Gifford H. Miller (University of Colorado Boulder) and Dr. David M. Hopkins (U.S. Geological Survey).

Brigham-Grette received her Ph.D. from the University of Colorado Boulder in May 1985 with the dissertation entitled “Marine Stratigraphy and Amino Acid Geochronology of the Gubik Formation, western Arctic Coastal Plain, Alaska”. Brigham-Grette's graduate degrees both incorporated the use of amino acid geochronology (Amino acid dating), a novel technique at the time. Amino acid geochronology, a dating technique based on changes in indigenous proteins preserved in carbonate shells, provides an estimate of the amount of time that has passed since the death of the organism. Brigham-Grette utilized this technique to correlate regional stratigraphic sections in order to resolve glacial geologic and sea level history.

Research and career 
Following her graduate work, Brigham-Grette was a Post-doctoral Research Fellow in the Department of Quaternary Geology, Geomorphology, and Marine Geology at the University of Bergen (Norway) from November 1983 to December 1984 where she worked with Dr. Hans-Petter Sejrup on the Geochronology of Quaternary sediments in the North Sea. Brigham-Grette subsequently was a Post-doctoral Research Fellow in the Department of Geology at the University of Alberta (Edmonton) and at the Geological Survey of Canada from May 1985 to May 1987 where she worked with Dr. Steven Blasco (Geological Survey of Canada), Bedford Institute of Oceanography) on the stratigraphy and geochronology of the Canadian Beaufort Sea Continental Shelf. In 1987 she became an assistant professor at the University of Massachusetts Amherst in what was the Department of Geology & Geography at the time (now Geosciences). Brigham-Grette was a Visiting Professor at the Alaska Quaternary Center, University of Alaska Museum of the North, Fairbanks from January–June 1990. In 1993 Brigham-Grette was promoted to Associate Professor becoming the third tenured female faculty member in the Department of Geosciences at the University of Massachusetts Amherst. In 2001, Brigham-Grette was promoted to Professor. Brigham-Grette teaches courses in Glacial Geology and Glaciology, Quaternary Glacial Stratigraphy, Quaternary Geochronology, and Oceanography. Dr. Julie Brigham-Grette serves as the first woman department head for the Geosciences Department at the University of Massachusetts Amherst (2013–present).

Brigham-Grette has served in numerous leadership roles in the international Arctic science community. Since 2008 she has been a member of the Polar Research Board of the National Academy of Sciences and has been the chairman since 2014. Brigham-Grette co-chaired the DOSECC Scientific Steering Committee to direct the renewed US Continental Drilling Program from 2010 to 2012 and was Vice-Chair of the DOSECC Board of Directors from 2011 to 2013. Since 2013 Brigham-Grette has been a member of the American Geophysical Union (AGU) Governance Board. Throughout her career, Brigham-Grette has also served on and directed panels and committees for the American Quaternary Association, U.S. Arctic Research Commission Logistics Joint Task Force, National Science Foundation, Geological Society of America, Past Global Changes (PAGES), the National Lacustrine Core Facility (LacCore), and the National Research Council, among others. Brigham-Grette has also been an editor/served on the editorial board for the following scientific journals: Quaternary International, Quaternary Science Reviews, Climate of the Past.

Research contributions 
Brigham-Grette has made significant research contributions to the fields of glaciology and Arctic paleoclimatology.

Brigham-Grette is recognized internationally for her leading role in the Lake El’gygytgyn Drilling Project. The sedimentary sequence from Lake El’gygytgyn, a meteorite impact crater lake formed 3.6 million years ago, was recovered in 2009 through an international research effort funded by the International Continental Scientific Drilling Program (ICDP), the US National Science Foundation (NSF), the Federal Ministry of Education and Research (Germany), the Russian Academy of Sciences, and the Austrian Federal Ministry of Science and Research. Lake El’gygytgyn contains the longest continuous record of Arctic climate from a continental location. Brigham-Grette was a lead principal investigator for the Lake El’gygytgyn Drilling Project along with Dr. Martin Melles (Germany), Dr. Pavel Sergeevich Minuyk (Russia) and Dr. Christian Koeberl (Austria). Brigham-Grette first received funding from NSF to conduct a pilot investigation of Lake El’gygytgyn in 1996. Following a successful field season and interesting initial results, Brigham-Grette was awarded another NSF grant in 2000 to conduct sediment coring and to investigate the modern limnological conditions of the lake. In 2005, ICDP funded the full proposal for scientific drilling at Lake El’gygytgyn. In winter 2009 during a 5-month field season, Lake El’gygytgyn was drilled through the ice and the entire sedimentary sequence was recovered; drilling also recovered the rocks from the impact crater. The first paleoclimate results of the Lake El’gygytgyn Drilling Project were presented in the journal Science (journal) by Melles, Brigham-Grette and co-authors, who investigated arctic climate history from the Lake El’gygytgyn record during the past 2.8 Ma (the Pleistocene). This paper was followed by another publication in  Science (journal) in 2013 by Brigham-Grette and co-authors, where Arctic climate history of the Pliocene portion of the Lake El’gygytgyn record was presented (2.6 to 2.8 million years ago). An important finding of both papers is demonstrating the significant impact of polar amplification. During the Pleistocene, Lake El’gygytgyn experienced numerous “super interglacials” with temperatures approximately 4-5 °C higher and precipitation approximately 300 mm higher than during the Holocenes. In the mid-Pliocene Warm Period, when atmospheric carbon dioxide concentrations were likely similar to today, summer temperatures at Lake El’gygytgyn were approximately 8 °C higher. Some of the subsequent results of the Lake El’gygytgyn Drilling Project  were presented by over 50 scientists in a special issue of Climate of the Past and a special issue of Meteoritics and Planetary Science. Research on materials recovered from Lake El’gygytgyn Drilling Project continues today.

Teaching and outreach 
One of Brigham-Grette's passions is teaching about arctic climate change. Since 2003 she has been the leader or co-leader of a Research Experiences for Undergraduates (REU) training program in Svalbard (Norway). This program provides undergraduates with hands on research investigating the links between climate, glacial mass balance, sediment transport, and lake and fjord sedimentation from a location that has warmed significantly during the past 90 years. Brigham-Grette has worked with four Polar TREC teachers since 2009 taking high school teachers to the arctic to participate in field research expeditions.

Brigham-Grette has also been outspoken about how paleoclimate data can help us understand current and future climate change. She has given numerous lectures  and appeared on radio shows talking about how Arctic climate has changed since the Pliocene and what we can expect as climate change continues.

Awards 
2002 Elected Fellow Geological Society of America
2003 Albion College Distinguished Alumni Award
2011-2012 UMASS Samuel F. Conti Faculty Research Fellowship
2015 Austrian Academy of Sciences Suess Lecture
2015 University of Southampton Gregory Lecture
2015 AGU Global Environmental Change Tyndall Lecturer
2016 Elected Fellow American Geophysical Union

References 

Women geologists
American women geologists
American earth scientists
Albion College alumni
University of Colorado Boulder alumni
University of Massachusetts Amherst faculty
Living people
Year of birth missing (living people)
American women academics
21st-century American women